The black-throated flowerpiercer (Diglossa brunneiventris) is a species of bird in the family Thraupidae.

It is found in the northern Andes (mainly in Peru but also in Colombia, western Bolivia and far northern Chile). Its natural habitats are subtropical or tropical moist montane forests, subtropical or tropical high-altitude shrubland, and heavily degraded former forest.

Gallery

References

black-throated flowerpiercer
Birds of the Colombian Andes
Birds of the Peruvian Andes
black-throated flowerpiercer
Taxonomy articles created by Polbot